Timothy M. Lohman (born 1951) earned his Ph.D. in physical chemistry from the University of Wisconsin-Madison in 1977. After completing his Ph.D., he furthered his training with postdoctoral research at the University of California and the University of Oregon. He is currently a Professor in the Department of Biochemistry and Molecular Biophysics at the Washington University School of Medicine. He has been named to the position of Marvin A. Brennecke Professor of Biological Chemistry and in 2008 served as president of the Gibbs Society of Biological Thermodynamics. 
He will be giving the second annual Gary K. Ackers Lecture at the 24th annual meeting of the Gibbs Society of Biological Thermodynamics.

Lohman's research has centered on obtaining a molecular understanding of the mechanisms of protein-nucleic acid interactions involved in DNA metabolism, in particular, DNA motor proteins, such as helicases and translocases, and single stranded DNA binding proteins. thermodynamic, kinetic, structural and single molecule approaches are used by his lab to observe these interactions.

Dr. Lohman is married and has two children. Professor Lohman is an accomplished golfer (USGA handicap index 13.1, as of July 2012).

Notable publications

Graduate students and postdoctoral associates
Wlodek Bujalowski, University of Texas Medical Branch
Christopher J. Fischer, University of Kansas
Aaron L. Lucius, University of Alabama-Birmingham
N. Karl Maluf, University of Colorado Denver

External links 
 Faculty Page
 Lab Page
 Publication list at Pubmed

References 

American physical chemists
Living people
 University of Wisconsin–Madison College of Letters and Science alumni
Scientists from St. Louis
1951 births
American biophysicists